Lucio De Santis (16 November 1922 - 23 August 2006) was an Italian actor. He appeared in more than twenty films from 1953 to 1970. De Santis was married to fellow actress Dina De Santis.

Filmography

References

External links 

1922 births
2006 deaths
Italian male film actors